The General Tactical Vehicles JLTV Eagle (Joint Light Tactical Vehicle) was one of six competitors for a Joint Light Tactical Vehicle that will replace the Humvee. The Eagle JLTV was to provide more protection and performance than the current Humvee. The JLTV Eagle was not selected for the Engineering and Manufacturing Development (EMD) phase of the program.

References

External links
 GeneralTacticalVehicles website 
 General Dynamics website

Military light utility vehicles